Transport and Map Symbols is a Unicode block containing transportation and map icons, largely for compatibility with Japanese telephone carriers' emoji implementations of Shift JIS, and to encode characters in the Wingdings and Wingdings 2 character sets.

Block

Emoji
The Transport and Map Symbols block contains 105 emoji:
U+1F680–U+1F6C5, U+1F6CB–U+1F6D2, U+1F6D5–U+1F6D7, U+1F6DC–U+1F6E5, U+1F6E9, U+1F6EB–U+1F6EC, U+1F6F0 and U+1F6F3–U+1F6FC.

The block has 46 standardized variants defined to specify emoji-style (U+FE0F VS16) or text presentation (U+FE0E VS15) for the
following 23 base characters: U+1F687, U+1F68D, U+1F691, U+1F694, U+1F698, U+1F6AD, U+1F6B2, U+1F6B9–U+1F6BA, U+1F6BC, U+1F6CB, U+1F6CD–U+1F6CF, U+1F6E0–U+1F6E5, U+1F6E9, U+1F6F0 and U+1F6F3.
All of these base characters default to a text presentation.

Emoji modifiers

The Transport and Map Symbols block has six emoji that represent people or body parts.
They can be modified using U+1F3FB–U+1F3FF to provide for a range of human skin color using the Fitzpatrick scale:

Additional human emoji can be found in other Unicode blocks: Dingbats, Emoticons, Miscellaneous Symbols, Miscellaneous Symbols and Pictographs, Supplemental Symbols and Pictographs and Symbols and Pictographs Extended-A.

History
The following Unicode-related documents record the purpose and process of defining specific characters in the Transport and Map Symbols block:

References 

Unicode blocks
Emoji
Transport